"I seek you" is used in telecommunications to request a response:

 CQ (call), two-letter pronunciation used for morse and voice communication
 ICQ, instant messaging protocol named after the phase

See also
 CQ (disambiguation)